Sgorr na Dìollaid is a mountain in the Northwest Highlands of Scotland. It is situated between Glen Strathfarrar and Glen Cannich, 7 km north-west of the village of Cannich.

References

Corbetts
Marilyns of Scotland
Mountains and hills of the Northwest Highlands
Mountains and hills of Highland (council area)